Noppawan Lertcheewakarn and Sandra Roma were the defending champions, but Roma chose not to participate in the Juniors that year.Lertcheewakarn partnered with Elena Bogdan, but Valeriya Solovyeva and Maryna Zanevska defeated them in the final 1–6, 6–3 [10–7].

Seeds

Draw

Finals

Top half

Bottom half
{{16TeamBracket-Compact-Tennis3
| RD1=First round
| RD2=Second round
| RD3=Quarterfinals
| RD4=Semifinals
| RD1-seed01=7
| RD1-team01=
| RD1-score01-1=1
| RD1-score01-2=6
| RD1-score01-3=[10]
| RD1-seed02= 
| RD1-team02= G Brodsky A Muhammad 
| RD1-score02-1=6
| RD1-score02-2=4
| RD1-score02-3=[5]
| RD1-seed03= 
| RD1-team03= P Pekhova E Svitolina 
| RD1-score03-1=3
| RD1-score03-2=0
| RD1-score03-3= 
| RD1-seed04= 
| RD1-team04= C Dinu GS Ysidora
| RD1-score04-1=6
| RD1-score04-2=6
| RD1-score04-3= 
| RD1-seed05= 
| RD1-team05= A Orlik L Robson
| RD1-score05-1=6
| RD1-score05-2=3
| RD1-score05-3=[5]
| RD1-seed06= 
| RD1-team06= M Inoue R Ozaki
| RD1-score06-1=2
| RD1-score06-2=6
| RD1-score06-3=[10]
| RD1-seed07= 
| RD1-team07= A Beck D Papamichail
| RD1-score07-1=4
| RD1-score07-2=2
| RD1-score07-3= 
| RD1-seed08=4
| RD1-team08= M Burdette S Stephens
| RD1-score08-1=6
| RD1-score08-2=6
| RD1-score08-3= 
| RD1-seed09=8
| RD1-team09= U Eikeri M Grage
| RD1-score09-1=1
| RD1-score09-2=2
| RD1-score09-3= 
| RD1-seed10= 
| RD1-team10= V Solovieva M Zanevska
| RD1-score10-1=6
| RD1-score10-2=6
| RD1-score10-3= 
| RD1-seed11= 
| RD1-team11= L Kumkhum A Omae
| RD1-score11-1=6
| RD1-score11-2=4
| RD1-score11-3=[6]
| RD1-seed12= 
| RD1-team12= A Cercone N Scott
| RD1-score12-1=3
| RD1-score12-2=6
| RD1-score12-3=[10]
| RD1-seed13= 
| RD1-team13= G Dabrowski P Ormaechea
| RD1-score13-1=3
| RD1-score13-2=2
| RD1-score13-3= 
| RD1-seed14= 
| RD1-team14= J Cako N Gibbs
| RD1-score14-1=6
| RD1-score14-2=6
| RD1-score14-3= 
| RD1-seed15= 
| RD1-team15= F Al-Nabhani N Pintusova
| RD1-score15-1=3
| RD1-score15-2=2
| RD1-score15-3= 
| RD1-seed16=2
| RD1-team16= T Babos A Tomljanovic
| RD1-score16-1=6
| RD1-score16-2=6
| RD1-score16-3= 
| RD2-seed01=7
| RD2-team01=

External links 
 Main Draw

Girls' Doubles
US Open, 2009 Girls' Doubles|2009